William Ross may refer to:

Nobility
William I, Earl of Ross (died 1274), ruler of the province of Ross in northern Scotland
William II, Earl of Ross (died c. 1323), ruler of the province of Ross in northern Scotland
William Ross, 8th Lord Ross (died 1640), Scottish nobleman
William Ross, 10th Lord Ross (died 1656), Scottish nobleman
William Ross, 12th Lord Ross (died 1738), Scottish nobleman, soldier and politician
William Ross, 14th Lord Ross (died 1754), Scottish nobleman

Politics
William Ross (speaker) (died 1830), New York politician, Speaker of the State Assembly 1814
William H. H. Ross (1814–1887), American politician and former governor of Delaware
William Ross (Canadian politician) (1824–1912), merchant, ship builder and politician in Nova Scotia, Canada
William Ross (Ontario politician) (1854–1937), merchant and politician in Ontario, Canada
William Benjamin Ross (1855–1929), Canadian politician, lawyer and businessman
William Roderick Ross (1869–1928), lawyer and politician in British Columbia, Canada
William Donald Ross (1869–1947), financier, banker and Lieutenant Governor of Ontario
William B. Ross (1873–1924), Governor of Wyoming
William Henry Ross (1886–1943), provincial level politician from Alberta, Canada
Bill Ross (Australian politician) (1888–1966), member of the New South Wales Legislative Assembly
William Gladstone Ross (1889–1948), lawyer, judge and politician in Saskatchewan, Canada
Willie Ross, Baron Ross of Marnock (1911–1988), Secretary of State for Scotland in the 1960s
William Cecil Ross (1911–1998), leader of the (communist) Labour Progressive Party of Manitoba in 1945
William Ross (Unionist politician) (born 1936), Ulster Unionist Party member of Parliament until 2001

Sports
William Ross (cricketer) (fl. 1860), Australian cricketer
William Ross (footballer, born 1874) (1874–?), English professional footballer active in the 1890s
William Ross (baseball) (1893–1964), American Negro leagues baseball player
William Ross (rower) (1900–?), Canadian Olympic rower
William Alexander Ross (1913–1942), Scottish rugby player
William Ross (footballer, born 1921) (1921–1995), Scottish footballer
William Ross (water polo) (born 1928), US water polo player who competed in the 1956 Summer Olympics
Bill Ross (footballer) (born 1944), Australian rules footballer
Eric Ross (William Eric Ross, born 1944), Northern Irish footballer

Other people
William Ross (poet) (1762–1790/91), Scottish Gaelic poet 
William Charles Ross (1794–1860), British artist
William P. Ross (1820–1891), Principal Chief of the Cherokee Nation
William Murray Ross (1825–1904), entrepreneur in Melbourne
William Stewart Ross (1844–1906), Scottish writer and publisher
W. D. Ross (William David Ross, 1877–1971), British philosopher
William Ross (theatrical producer) (1915–1994), State Managers Association, Actors' Equity Association
William Ross (actor) (1923–2014), Tokyo-based American actor, voice actor, voice director and editor, and the founder of Frontier Enterprises
William Ross (composer) (born 1948), soundtrack composer

Fictional
William Ross (Star Trek), a character in Star Trek

See also
Willie Ross (disambiguation)